USS Spray has been the name of more than one United States Navy ship, and may refer to:

 , a trawler in commission from 1918 to 1919
 , a motorboat ordered delivered to the Navy in 1917 for use as a patrol vessel but never taken over by the Navy

Spray